Vincent de Paul Wehrle, O.S.B., (December 19, 1855 – November 2, 1941) was a Swiss-born Benedictine monk and prelate of the Roman Catholic Church. His birth name was Johann Baptist Wehrle.

Wehrle served as the first bishop of the new Diocese of Bismarck in North Dakota from 1910 to 1939.

Biography

Early life 
Vincent Wehrle was born on December 19, 1855, in Berg, St. Gallen, Switzerland to Johann Baptist and Elisabeth (née Hafner) Wehrle. He studied at the minor seminary of St. Gallen for four years, when it was closed down by an anti-clerical state government. He then studied at Einsiedeln Abbey for two years. He made his profession as a member of the Order of St. Benedict (more commonly known as the Benedictines) at Einsiedeln on December 3, 1876.

Priesthood 
Wehrle was later ordained to the priesthood on April 23, 1882. That same year he was sent by his superiors to the United States, where he joined Subiaco Abbey in Logan County, Arkansas. He later went to St. Meinrad Abbey in Spencer County, Indiana.

In 1887, Wehrle came to the Dakota Territory and was named chancellor by Bishop Martin Mary. After laboring as a missionary among the Native Americans in Yankton, South Dakota, he was assigned as pastor of Devils Lake, North Dakota. He there founded St. Gall's Priory in 1893, and was elected as its first prior. He later established Assumption Abbey at Richardton, North Dakota, where he was abbot, in 1903. He also established new parishes in the surrounding towns of Mott, Richardton, Lefor, and Strasburg, all in North Dakota

Bishop of Bismarck 
On April 9, 1910, Wehrle was appointed the first bishop of the newly erected Diocese of Bismarck by Pope Pius X. He received his episcopal consecration on May 19, 1910, from Archbishop John Ireland, with Bishops James McGolrick and James Trobec serving as co-consecrators, at the chapel of St. Paul Seminary in Minnesota. His installation took place on June 16, 1910, and was attended by North Dakota Governor John Burke. 

During his 29-year-long tenure, Wehrle presided over a period of great growth for the church. From 1910 to 1939, the number of Catholics increased from 25,000 to 55,000; and 55 churches, 115 congregations, 18 parochial schools, and four hospitals were established. He also began construction on the Cathedral of the Holy Spirit, but was forced to abandon his efforts due to the Great Depression.

By 1937, Wehrle's health had begun to fail and he became a patient at St. Alexius Hospital in Bismarck.

Retirement and legacy 
Pope Pius XII accepted Wehrle's resignation as resigned as Bishop of Bismarck on December 11, 1939 and appointed him Titular Bishop of Teos on the same date. 

Vincent Wehrle died on November 2, 1941, at age 85. He is interred at the Assumption Abbey Church Crypt in Richardton, North Dakota.

References

Episcopal succession

1855 births
1941 deaths
People from the canton of St. Gallen
Swiss Benedictines
Swiss Roman Catholic missionaries
Swiss emigrants to the United States
American Benedictines
Benedictine bishops
Roman Catholic bishops of Bismarck
20th-century Roman Catholic bishops in the United States